Johann Friedrich Schannat (23 July 1683 – 6 March 1739) was a German historian.

Schannat was born in Luxembourg.  He studied at the University of Louvain and when twenty-two years of age was a lawyer, but before long he turned his attention exclusively to history and became a priest. The Prince-Abbot of Fulda commissioned Schannat to write the history of the abbey and appointed him historiographer and librarian. At a later date he received similar commissions from Franz Georg von Schönborn, Archbishop of Trier and Bishop of Worms. In 1735 the Archbishop of Prague, Count Moriz von Manderscheid, sent Schannat to Italy to collect material for a history of the councils. He made researches with especial success in the Ambrosian Library in Milan and the Vatican Library at Rome. He died in Heidelberg.

Publications
Vindemiae literariae (1723–24); 
Corpus traditionum Fuldensium (1724); 
Fuldischer Lehnhof (1726); 
Dioecesis Fuldensis (1727); 
Historia Fuldensis (1729); 
Historia episcopatus Wormatiensis (1734); 
Histoire abregee de la maison Palatine (1740). 
Concilia Germaniae, edited from material left by Schannat and continued by the Jesuit Joseph Hartzheim (11 fol. vols., 1759–90). 
Eiflia illustrata (1825–55) was also published at a later date.

References 

Attribution
 Cites:
LA BARRE DE BEAUMARCHAIS, Eloge historique de l'abbe Schannat in SCHANNAT, Histoire abregee de la maison Palatine; 
WILL in Hessenland, V (Cassel, 1891), 92-93, 102-105.

1683 births
1739 deaths
18th-century German historians
German male non-fiction writers
History of the Eifel